Moerdijk is a town in the South of the Netherlands.

Moerdijk may also refer to:
 Moerdijk bridges, Island of Dordrecht, Netherlands

People with the surname
 Gerard Moerdijk (1890–1958), South African architect
 Ieke Moerdijk (born 1958), Dutch mathematician